Tower Hamlets Summer University (THSU) is a British charity in the Tower Hamlets area of London which offers independent learning programs for people from 11 to 25 years of age.  It rebranded to the name Futureversity in 2010.

Projects

Holiday courses for young people 

THSU runs short courses, typically two to five days long on a non-residential basis, are provided free of charge to young people aged 11 to 25 across the borough of Tower Hamlets during school holidays.  Courses cover such subjects as Careers in the City, The Trading Floor, Photography, Driving Theory, First Aid, Maths without Calculators, Jewellery Design and Making, Bollywood Dance, Film Making, Kick & Thai Boxing, Cricket, Tourism and Psychology.

Nang! Magazine 

Through one of the courses offered by THSU Nang! is produced.

Summer Uni London 

Summer Uni London was a project commissioned to THSU by the Department for Education and Skills to develop other Summer Unis across London through training, support and resources.

Job Ready 

A successful employment programme for unemployed 16- to 25-year-olds.

Youth Volunteering 

THSU promotes youth volunteering including (but not limited to) participating in the Nang! project, as a Summer Uni Peer, or by joining FAB.

Summer Uni Peers 

Up to 40 volunteers (aged 16–25) volunteer to support the holiday programmes as Peer Motivators or Team Leaders.

FAB (Futureversity Advisory Board)

The trustee board is informed by a Youth Advisory Group who represent the views of young people to the board.  Two young people from this group also sit on the board of trustees.

History 

Tower Hamlets Summer University was piloted in 1995 to help reduce youth crime in the borough during the summer holiday period.  Since then, the charity has grown and inspired many other boroughs to pilot Summer Unis in London and across the UK

1993 

In 1993, Lord Young of Dartington commissioned a research project to find out why youth crime increased each summer.  The research concluded with a number of recommendations regarding summer provision for young people in the borough.

1995 

In 1995, the Education Business Partnership and the borough invested time and money in piloting a programme of activities for 14- to 21-year-olds.  This blue-print for Summer Uni was thoroughly documented with all results published in the autumn.

1996 

In 1996, two senior workers from the youth and arts sector (David Holloway OBE and Elizabeth Lynch) were seconded from the London Borough of Tower Hamlets, becoming the Directors of TH Summer University and established the Tower Hamlets programme and national roll-out. It was registered as a charity and company limited by guarantee ("Tower Hamlets Summer Education Ltd") in February of that year.

This pilot was additionally the blue print for the University of the First Age in 1996.

Late 1990s 

By 1997, Hackney, Brent, Newham, Islington and Southwark piloted their own programmes and in the next two years, other boroughs and other areas of the country followed suit. Funding from the Lottery and the New Opportunities Fund helped this momentum.

2006 

In 2006, Lord Andrew Adonis and the London Challenge team (part of the Department for Education and Skills) commissioned Tower Hamlets Summer University to roll out the model to every London borough.  The young participants of Tower Hamlets Summer University chose to call this project 'Summer Uni London'.  Summer Uni London was launched in June 2006.

2010 

In 2010, THSU and Summer Uni London rebranded as Futureversity to help represent the nationwide expansion goals of the charity.

References

External links
Futureversity Official site.

Charities based in London
Youth organisations based in the United Kingdom
Education in the London Borough of Tower Hamlets
Educational charities based in the United Kingdom
Companies based in the London Borough of Tower Hamlets